Hardboiled Rose is a 1929 American part-talkie romantic drama film directed by F. Harmon Weight and released by Warner Bros. It starred Myrna Loy, William Collier, Jr., and John Miljan.

Plot
A Southern belle (Loy) must work in a gambling house to pay off her father's debts, which drove him to suicide. She then meets a man who sweeps her off her feet and takes her away from it all.

Cast
 Myrna Loy as Rose Dunhamel
 William Collier, Jr. as Edward Malo
 John Miljan as Steve Wallace
 Gladys Brockwell as Julie Malo
 Lucy Beaumont as Grandmama Dunhamel
 Ralph Emerson as John Trask
 Edward Martindel as Jefferson Dunhamel
 Otto Hoffman as Apyton Hale
 Floyd Shackelford as Butler

Production
This was Loy's second starring role in a movie, after Turn Back the Hours (1928). Hardboiled Rose would become Myrna Loy's last part-talkie. After this movie Myrna Loy would make all-talking movies, with some filmed in Technicolor. Loy's early talkies in Technicolor were The Desert Song (1929, Warner Brothers' first movie released in color), The Show of Shows (1929) and Under a Texas Moon (1930, the second all color-all talking movie to be filmed outdoors).

In 1933, Loy's Warners contract ended and she signed with Metro-Goldwyn-Mayer. In 1934, Myrna Loy made two movies with MGM that would make her a big star for the next 20 years, Manhattan Melodrama and The Thin Man.

Sound
According to TV Guide.com's review of Hardboiled Rose, the talking sequences were added to the movie later in production. All studios were converting to sound, so major studio releases had to be at least a part-talkie.

Film preservation
The film elements for Hardboiled Rose still survive, but the soundtrack which was recorded on Vitaphone discs, is lost except the fourth reel disc.

See also
List of Warner Bros. films
Myrna Loy filmography
Silent movies
Vitaphone
List of early Warner Bros. sound and talking features

References

External links

1929 films
1929 romantic drama films
American black-and-white films
American romantic drama films
Films directed by F. Harmon Weight
Films about gambling
Transitional sound films
Warner Bros. films
Films with screenplays by Robert Lord (screenwriter)
1920s American films